Ardrey Kell High School is a public high school serving grades 9–12 in the Ballantyne area of Charlotte, North Carolina, United States. The school is part of Charlotte-Mecklenburg Schools district.

History
Established in 2006, Ardrey Kell High School was built in the growing Ballantyne area of Charlotte. Ardrey Kell was named after two prominent local families in the area known as "Lower Providence"  in southern Mecklenburg County.  Both families have served the community as farmers, physicians, educators, politicians and church leaders.  The school is located on Ardrey Kell Road.

Notable alumni 
 Tessa Blanchard, professional wrestler and actress
 Giuseppe Gentile, professional soccer player
 Tucker Lepley, professional soccer player
 Julian Okwara, NFL defensive end and younger brother of Romeo Okwara
 Romeo Okwara, NFL defensive end
 Andrew Pannenberg, professional soccer player
 Jack Reinheimer, MLB shortstop
 Mike Senatore, creator of the water bottle flip viral internet trend
 Prince Shembo, NFL linebacker
 Trent Thornton, MLB pitcher
 Alex Wood, MLB pitcher, 2017 All-Star selection and 2020 World Series champion

References

External links

Schools in Charlotte, North Carolina
Public high schools in North Carolina
Educational institutions established in 2006
2006 establishments in North Carolina